Evergreen Lake is a lake located northeast of Stillwater, New York. The outflow creek flows into Stillwater Reservoir. Fish species present in the lake are brown bullhead, and brook trout. Access via trail from the north shore of Stillwater Reservoir. No motors are allowed on Evergreen Lake.

References

Lakes of Herkimer County, New York